The Jeff Foxworthy Show is an American sitcom television series created by Tom Anderson, starring comedian Jeff Foxworthy and based on Foxworthy's stand-up comedy routine. It originally aired from September 12, 1995 to May 5, 1997 on ABC (season 1) and NBC (season 2).

History

ABC era
The first series aired on ABC during the 1995–1996 season, but was cancelled after one season. NBC picked up the show for the following season, but despite improving in the ratings, it was again cancelled after one season. In the first season, network executives considered his routine "too Southern" for a national network and based his sitcom in Bloomington, Indiana.

Jay Mohr and Bob Saget made regular or cameo appearances, as did country singers Tim McGraw and Travis Tritt.

Cast 
Jeff Foxworthy as Himself
Anita Barone as Karen Foxworthy (1995–1996)
Haley Joel Osment as Matt Foxworthy
Matt Clark as Walt Bacon (1995–1996)
Matt Borlenghi as Russ Francis (1995–1996)
Dakin Matthews as Elliot (1995–1996)
Bibi Besch as Lois (1995–1996)
Debra Jo Rupp as Gayle (1995–1996)
Jay Mohr as Wayne Foxworthy (1996)
Michelle Clunie as DeeDee Landrow (1996)
Sue Murphy as Sandi (1995)
Steve Hytner as Craig Lesko (1995)

NBC era
When the show moved to NBC, in addition to the casting changes, the show's production changed. In the first series, the show was recorded on tape; the second season was shot on film. In the second season, the show was set in the fictitious town of Briarton in Calhoun County, Georgia, based on Foxworthy's real-life hometown in the South, and the series was given a redesigned opening and theme.

Haley Joel Osment was the only other actor besides Foxworthy to make the move to NBC with the series, and Jeff's wife Karen was the only character that carried over with Jeff and Matt, though the role was filled by a new actress. Jonathan Lipnicki was added to the cast as the Foxworthys' other son Justin.

Cast
Jeff Foxworthy as Himself 
Ann Cusack as Karen Foxworthy (1996–1997)
Haley Joel Osment as Matt Foxworthy
Jonathan Lipnicki as Justin Foxworthy (1996–1997)
Bill Engvall as Bill Pelton (1996–1997)
G. W. Bailey as Big Jim Foxworthy (1996–1997)
Neil Giuntoli - Florus Workman (1996-1997)
Jeanine Jackson as Livie Ann Pitts (1996)
Kathryn Zaremba as Nettie (1996–1997)
Candy Trubucco as Candy Conklin (1996–1997)
Dave Powledge as Ebb Conklin (1996)
Paula Sorge as Betty Pelton (1996–1997)
Darryl Theirse as Andre Tucsan (1997)
Harold Baines as Ernie Binderman (1997)
Kevin Crowley as Trey (1997)

Episodes

Series overview

Season 1 (1995–96)

Season 2 (1996–97)

Broadcast
Reruns aired on the USA Network from January 14, 2000 to August 4, 2001. In 2005, Nick@Nite began airing the show. It was removed from the lineup a few years later. In 2012, TBS began airing the show on Saturday mornings from 5 to 5:30 am. 

In early October 2016, the sitcom came back to TV twice over: first on INSP Friday nights 10p-12a PT/1a-3a ET starting with season 2 on October 7. Then season 1 started broadcasting on Tuesday, October 11 on Get TV 5p-6:30p PT/8p-9:30p ET with repeats the following Friday night/Saturday morning at 1a PT/4a ET. The show now airs on Circle.

Home media
Sony Pictures Home Entertainment released the entire series on DVD in Region 1 for the first time between 2004–2009.

On August 27, 2013, it was announced that Minnesota-based Mill Creek Entertainment had acquired the home media distribution rights to various television series from the Sony Pictures Television library including The Jeff Foxworthy Show.  On August 18, 2015, they re-released both seasons on DVD in a 4-disc complete series set.

Streaming
The series was formerly available on Pure Flix Entertainment's streaming service (later acquired by the show's distributor,  Sony Pictures in 2021). The series is also available on Crackle and  Tubi in the United States and the CTV Television Network's streaming service, CTV Throwback in Canada. As of 2021, both seasons were formerly available on NBC's streaming service, Peacock.

References

External links
 

1990s American sitcoms
1995 American television series debuts
1997 American television series endings
American Broadcasting Company original programming
English-language television shows
NBC original programming
American television series revived after cancellation
Television series by Sony Pictures Television
Television shows set in Georgia (U.S. state)
Television shows set in Indiana